Araksi Çetinyan was the winner of the first beauty contest held in the newly founded Turkish Republic.

The pageant was held by İpek Film on May 3, 1925, or 1926 (sources differ) at Istanbul’s Beyoğlu Melek Cinema Hall (present-day Emek Cinema Hall). However, the contest was not considered serious and was subsequently annulled due to favouritism and lack of organisation. Mustafa Özgur of Vakit newspaper wrote: "In 1926, at a beauty contest attempted by İpek Film Şirketi, an Armenian girl named Miss Araksi Çetinyan was chosen as the winner; however, the contest, which Turkish girls took no interest in, was ultimately disregarded."

In 1929 Çetinyan participated at the first Miss Turkey competition and finished in 3rd place after Feriha Tevfik and Semine Nihat. She was of Armenian descent.

References

Armenians from the Ottoman Empire
Turkish people of Armenian descent
Turkish beauty pageant winners
Possibly living people
Year of birth missing